Coleophora tridentifera is a moth of the family Coleophoridae. It is found in Spain.

The larvae feed on Carex bellardii.

References

tridentifera
Moths of Europe
Moths described in 1985